The General Norzagaray Bridge is a brick and masonry barrel vault bridge built in 1855 in San Juan, Puerto Rico. Also known as Puente de los Frailes, it brings what is now Puerto Rico Highway 873 across Frailes Creek, a tributary to the Guaynabo River. It has eight  barrel vault spans. It was listed on the National Register of Historic Places (NRHP) in 1995.

In 1855, it was important for carrying the Carretara Central across Quebrada Frailes.

It is named for Fernándo de Norzagaray y Escudero, governor of Puerto Rico from 1852 to 1855.

It was designed by chief engineer Manuel Sanchez-Nunez y Layne and built by engineer Gustavo Steinacher (who also designed and built the first suspension bridge in the Caribbean, over the Cagüitas River just north of Caguas, Puerto Rico) and cost 45,346 pesos.

According to its NRHP registration, it "is one of the most impressive bridges from the Spanish Colonial period", serving as a "prime example of Spanish 19th century masonry arch technology". It is the only such example in the United States.

The superstructure of the bridge was modified in 1927 by removal of earth fill and addition of steel girders installed on the arch piers to support a concrete deck.  This does not interfere significantly with the historic integrity of the bridge.

It spans between what are now the barrios of Caimito and Tortugo in San Juan.

Gallery

See also
 List of bridges documented by the Historic American Engineering Record in Puerto Rico

References

External links
 

Road bridges on the National Register of Historic Places in Puerto Rico
Bridges completed in 1855
Arch bridges in the United States
Brick bridges in the United States
Historic American Engineering Record in Puerto Rico
1855 establishments in Puerto Rico
National Register of Historic Places in San Juan, Puerto Rico
Transportation in San Juan, Puerto Rico